Events from the year 1781 in Sweden

Incumbents
 Monarch – Gustav III

Events

 
 24 January - Tolerance Act (Sweden)
 
 
 
 - The French Theater of Gustav III is composed and inaugurated.  
    
 - Min son på galejan by Jacob Wallenberg.
 - Passionerna by Thomas Thorild.

Births

 
 February 19 - Adolf Zethelius, silversmith, industrialist  (died 1864)
 19 August - Margaretha Heijkenskjöld, traveler and dress reformer   (died 1834)
 
 26 September – Carl Fredrik af Wingård, politician and Lutheran clergyman  (died 1851)

 - Anna Maria Thalén, Swedish fashion trader (died 1851)

Deaths

 
 
 
 21 December - Johan Henrik Scheffel, artist (born 1690)
 12 September - Catharina Ebba Horn, royal mistress (born 1720)

References

 
Years of the 18th century in Sweden
Sweden